The Sony Xperia Z1 Compact is an Android smartphone produced by Sony. The Z1 Compact has a 4.3 inch display and is released as a cheaper and smaller version of the flagship Xperia Z1 which features a 5-inch display. The Z1 Compact is the first Sony smartphone to use an IPS panel, which improves markedly upon the poor viewing angles of the Xperia Z1 and its flagship predecessors like the Xperia Z and Xperia ZL.

The Japanese version of the Z1 Compact, dubbed the Sony Xperia Z1 f (SO-02F), was unveiled on 10 October 2013 and was released on 19 December 2013 exclusively for NTT DoCoMo. The international Z1 Compact was subsequently unveiled during a press conference at CES 2014 in Las Vegas on 6 January 2014 and was first released in Sweden on 24 January 2014; entering more markets in February and March 2014.

Hardware
Like its larger sibling, the Z1 Compact is waterproof and dust proof, and has an IP rating of IP55 and IP58. The key highlight of the Z1 Compact is its 20.7 megapixel Exmor RS camera, paired with Sony's in-house G lens and its image processing algorithm, called BIONZ. The phone also comes with a dedicated shutter button and has an aluminum unibody design, with a glass front and a plastic rear. The product white paper for this device was updated in mid-February 2014 to reflect the use of plastic on the rear panel, rather than the initially reported glass. The Z1 Compact is now running on android 5.1.1, which is probably its last update.

The Z1 Compact may be unofficially updated to Android 10.

See also
 Sony Xperia Z series
 Comparison of smartphones

References

External links

 Phone Specs

Android (operating system) devices
Discontinued flagship smartphones
Sony smartphones
Mobile phones introduced in 2014
Digital audio players